HMS Advice was a 50-gun fourth rate ship of the line of the Royal Navy, built by Joseph Allin the elder according to the 1706 Establishment of dimensions at Deptford Dockyard, and launched on 8 July 1712.

In 1744, she was renamed HMS Milford, and she was sold out of the navy in 1749.

Notes

References

Lavery, Brian (2003) The Ship of the Line - Volume 1: The development of the battlefleet 1650-1850. Conway Maritime Press. .

Ships of the line of the Royal Navy
1710s ships